Samar Hassounah (born 19 December 1987, Cairo) is an Egyptian synchronized swimmer. She competed in the women's team event at the 2012 Olympic Games.

References 

1987 births
Living people
Egyptian synchronized swimmers
Olympic synchronized swimmers of Egypt
Synchronized swimmers at the 2012 Summer Olympics

Sportspeople from Cairo